Morgan government may refer to:
First Morgan government, the Welsh Assembly Government led by Rhodri Morgan from 2000 to 2003
Second Morgan government, the Welsh Assembly Government led by Rhodri Morgan from 2003 to 2007
Third Morgan government, the Welsh Assembly Government led by Rhodri Morgan from May to July 2007
Fourth Morgan government, the Welsh Assembly Government led by Rhodri Morgan from July 2007 to 2009